The 1986 Svenska Cupen final took place on 2 July 1986 at Råsunda in Solna. The match was contested by Allsvenskan sides Malmö FF and IFK Göteborg. IFK Göteborg  played its first final since 1983 and its fourth final in total; Malmö FF played its first final since 1984 and its 15th final in total. Malmö FF won its 13th title with a 2–1 victory.

Match details

External links
Svenska Cupen at svenskfotboll.se

1986
Cupen
Malmö FF matches
IFK Göteborg matches
July 1986 sports events in Europe